A content farm or content mill, is a company that employs large numbers of freelance writers to generate a large amount of textual web content which is specifically designed to satisfy algorithms for maximal retrieval by automated search engines, known as SEO (search engine optimization). Their main goal is to generate advertising revenue through attracting reader page views, as first exposed in the context of social spam.

Articles in content farms have been found to contain identical passages across several media sources, leading to questions about the sites placing SEO goals over factual relevance. Proponents of the content farms claim that from a business perspective, traditional journalism is inefficient. Content farms often commission their writers' work based on analysis of search engine queries that proponents represent as "true market demand", a feature that traditional journalism purportedly lacks.

Characteristics 
Some sites labeled as content farms may contain a large number of articles and have been valued in the millions of dollars. In 2009, Wired magazine wrote that, according to founder and CEO Richard Rosenblatt of Demand Media (which includes eHow), that "by next summer, Demand will be publishing one million items a month, the equivalent of four English-language Wikipedias a year". Another site, Associated Content, was purchased in May 2010 by Yahoo! for $90 million. However, this new web site, which was renamed Yahoo! Voices, was shut down in 2014.

Pay scales for content are low compared to traditional salaries received by writers. One company compensated writers at a rate of $3.50 per article. Such rates are substantially lower than a typical writer might receive working for mainstream online publications; however, some content farm contributors produce many articles per day and may earn enough for a living. It has been observed that content writers are mostly women with children, English majors, or journalism students seeking supplemental income while working at home.

Criticisms 
Critics allege that content farms provide relatively low quality content, and that they maximize profit by producing "just good enough" material rather than high-quality articles. Articles are usually composed by human writers rather than automated processes, but they may not be written by a specialist in the subjects reported. Some authors working for sites identified as content farms have admitted knowing little about the fields on which they report. Search engines see content farms as a problem, as they tend to bring the user to less relevant and lower quality results of the search. The reduced quality and rapid creation of articles on such sites has drawn comparisons to the fast food industry and to pollution:

Reaction of search-engine providers 
In one of Google's promotional videos for search published in the summer of 2010, the majority of the links available were reported to be produced at content farms. In late February 2011, Google announced it was adjusting search algorithms significantly to "provide better rankings for high-quality sites—sites with original content and information such as research, in-depth reports, thoughtful analysis and so on." This was reported to be a reaction to content farms and an attempt to reduce their effectiveness in manipulating search result rankings.

The privacy-focused search engine DuckDuckGo does not show results from content farms.

Research 
Because of their recent appearance on the web, content farms have not yet received much explicit attention from the research community. The model of hiring inexpensive freelancers to produce content of marginal or questionable quality was first discussed as an alternative strategy to generating fake content automatically; this was discussed together with an example of the infrastructure necessary to make content-farm-based sites profitable through online ads, along with techniques to detect social spam that promotes such content.

While not explicitly motivated by content farms, there has been recent interest in the automatic categorisation of web sites according to the quality of their content. A detailed study on the application of these methods to the identification of content farm pages is yet to be done.

See also 
 Churnalism
 Click farm
 Essay mill
 Google Panda, a change to Google's search algorithm that is intended to filter out low-quality sites
 Link farm
 Search engine optimization
 Scraper site
 Spamdexing
 User-generated content

References 

Digital marketing
Online publishing
Search engine optimization